John Weale may refer to:
 John Weale (publisher)
 John Weale (Royal Navy officer)